Glutamyl endopeptidase II (GluSGP) is an enzyme. This enzyme catalyses the following chemical reaction

 Preferential cleavage: -Glu- >> -Asp- . Preference for Pro or Leu at P2 and Phe at P3. Cleavage of -Glu-Asp- and -Glu-Pro- bonds is slow
This enzyme is isolated from Streptomyces griseus.

References

External links 
 

EC 3.4.21